The Lombard Building is a Victorian era building built between 1889 and 1890, within the Melbourne CBD in Victoria, Australia. It was designed by the architectural practice of Reed, Henderson & Smart (1883–1890), now known as Bates Smart. The building was built to house several office practices, which it still operates as today.

History

Built between 1889 and 1890, the Lombard Building is a seven-storey office building including a basement level designed by the architecture firm at the time Reed, Henderson & Smart (Joseph Reed, Anketell Henderson & Francis Smart). Constructed for Balfour, Elliott & Co. the building was built in the Victorian era with a free classical style and sits on a Melbourne city block in Queen Street, . During its lifetime the building has changed hands and has been renovated many times. In July 1957 the building was traded at a price tag of $204,000 and was renovated on the upper floors and the lower ground in 1981 and 1985. By July 1987 the traded price had already risen to a value of $2.7 million, and was bought by Swiss Reinsurance Australia Ltd for $5 million in April 1990. During this time the entire building was renovated at a cost of $7 million, which was the highest cost for the building so far. Eventually the building was sold to its current owner, Lombard House Pty Ltd for $9.3 million. The building is currently used to lease office space.

Architecture

Built during the Victorian era, the building reflects the late boom style design where elements of the classical are arranged in a more free excessive way, hence being called free classical. The building sits on 15-17 Queen Street, Melbourne CBD with a site area of 590 m2 and has a frontage of 15.62 m. Built with 6 levels and a basement, the building reflects the Victorian era of skyscraper and is among the first buildings in Melbourne to have lifts. The floors are centered around two lifts and a central staircase, giving each level an approximate floor area of 350 m2 and a total approximate floor area of 2373 m2.

The building is constructed of load-bearing brick walls with internal structural iron and a stucco façade. The façade is complex as the building was designed to reflect the wealth of its owners at the time through the free classical style incorporating elements of 
arched openings, pediments, pilasters, a Hellenistic frieze and a large Diocletian window. The indication of new Queen Anne Revival style is evident in the picturesque roofline with a pedimented parapet and bold flanking chimney stacks. As with many buildings at the time, the basement is hidden behind iron balustrading at the ground floor level. In 1926 an electric lift was installed adjacent to the original hydraulic lift.

Occupants
List of current occupants within the Lombard Building:
 Lower Level 1 - Webber Design Structural Engineers
 Ground Level - Encoo
 Level 1 - Live Performance Australia & Peter Ryan Architects
 Level 2 - Godfrey Pembroke Financial Consultants Ltd, Portfolio and Wealth Management Pty Ltd & Johansson Solicitors
 Level 3 - Peter J Woodford Pty Ltd & AusBiotech
 Level 4 - Lion Selection Group (African and Asian Lion)
 Level 5 - LGR Telecommunications
 Level 6 - Great Vision Shipping & Tel Investment Trust

Gallery

References 

Office buildings in Melbourne
Heritage-listed buildings in Melbourne
Office buildings completed in 1890
1890 establishments in Australia
Buildings and structures in Melbourne City Centre